Tommy Olsen (born 17 February 1967) is a Norwegian ski-orienteering competitor. He received three medals at the 2004 World Ski Orienteering Championships in Östersund, a silver medal in the middle distance, a bronze medal in the long distance, and a silver medal in the relay (with Øystein Kvaal Østerbø, Anders Hauge and Eivind Tonna). He is two time national champion.

References

1967 births
Living people
Norwegian orienteers
Male orienteers
Ski-orienteers